Henda Zaouali (born 29 August 1960) is a retired Tunisian fencer. She competed in the women's individual foil and épée events at the 1996 Summer Olympics.

References

External links
 

1960 births
Living people
Tunisian female épée fencers
Olympic fencers of Tunisia
Fencers at the 1996 Summer Olympics
Tunisian female foil fencers
20th-century Tunisian women